Maulvi Sharafuddin Taqi is an Afghan Taliban politician, commander and Islamic scholar who is currently serving as Acting Deputy Minister of Disaster Management of the Islamic Emirate of Afghanistan since 23 November 2021. He is also serving as commander of the 215 Azam Corps of the Islamic Emirate Army since 4 October 2021.

References

Living people
Taliban government ministers of Afghanistan
Taliban commanders
Afghan military personnel
Year of birth missing (living people)